The Eleventh Commandment is a 1933 American pre-Code drama film directed by George Melford and starring Marian Marsh, Theodore von Eltz and Alan Hale. It is based on a play by Brandon Fleming. The story had previously been made into a 1924 British silent film.

Plot
When a wealthy unmarried woman dies without heirs, her estate is entrusted to her attorney. However his partner at the law firm schemes to get his hands on the money and hires a barmaid to pretend to be a relative and claim the estate.

Cast
Marian Marsh as Corinne Ross  
Theodore von Eltz as Wayne Winters  
Alan Hale as Max Stäger  
Marie Prevost as Tessie Florin 
Gloria Shea as Nina  
Arthur Hoyt as Charlie Moore  
William V. Mong as John Ross  
Lee Moran as Steve 
Ethel Wales as Mabel Moore  
Lyman Williams as Jerry Trent

References

External links

1933 drama films
1930s English-language films
American drama films
Films directed by George Melford
American films based on plays
American black-and-white films
1930s American films